Eternal Nightcap is the third studio album by Australian rock band The Whitlams, first released by Black Yak Phantom in September 1997. The album peaked at number 14 on the ARIA charts and was certified gold, and then triple platinum.

Single No Aphrodisiac was voted number 1 on the Triple J Hottest 100 in January 1997 and won Song of the Year at the 12th Annual ARIA Music Awards in 1998. Eternal Nightcap won Best Independent Release, and The Whitlams won Best Group. The band toured in support of the album and played 150 dates on the Learning Your ABC's National Tour presented by Triple J, Recovery and Rage.

A limited edition vinyl LP of Eternal Nightcap was released in 2006, with only 500 copies being pressed. Notably, "Love is Everywhere" and "Tangled Up in Blue" were left off this version of the album.

On 6 August 2009, The Whitlams played Eternal Nightcap in its entirety for the first time, with the exclusion of "Tangled up in Blue", at the Karova Lounge in Ballarat. In August 2009, they played the entire album in full before moving on to various other hits, first at The Corner Hotel in Victoria and then at the Tivoli in Brisbane.

In September 2022 the band played a national tour "Eternal Nightcap 25 Years" and released a remastered version of the Eternal Nightcap album. The 2022 re-release was baked and extracted from original 1/2 inch tapes. The 2022 vinyl release of the album included all tracks except 'Life's a Beach'.

Critical reception 

Critics praised the band's unique pop – rock style as an impressive step up from their last album, Undeniably The Whitlams. The album not only achieved critical acclaim but also commercial success as it became the biggest selling independent album in Australian history. On 3 December 2006, it was announced that Eternal Nightcap was voted number 27 in ABC's list, Australia's Favourite Album. Eternal Nightcap was also placed at number 17 in the Triple J Hottest 100 Australian Albums of All Time, 2011.

Resissues

New Zealand 
Eternal Nightcap – New Zealand Release was the first album released by The Whitlams specifically for a country other than Australia. Eternal Nightcap – New Zealand Release contained 17 tracks selected from the band's first three studio albums: Introducing The Whitlams, Undeniably The Whitlams and Eternal Nightcap. The album was released by Black Yak Phantom in 1999, and includes many former singles and B-sides from the first three albums including "You Sound Like Louis Burdett", "No Aphrodisiac", "Charlie" Nos. 1–3, "Melbourne" and "Following My Own Tracks".

Canadian 
Eternal Nightcap – Canadian Release was the second album released by The Whitlams specifically for a country other than Australia. Eternal Nightcap – Canadian Release contains 13 tracks selected from two of their studio albums, Eternal Nightcap and Undeniably The Whitlams – Reworked. This album was released by Black Yak Phantom/Warner Music Canada in 2000, coinciding with The Whitlams Canadian tour supporting Blue Rodeo.

It consists mostly of tracks from the Australian release of Eternal Nightcap, along with some 4-tracks from Undeniably The Whitlams - Reworked, and the track "1999", a remix of the track "1995" which was first released on Undeniably The Whitlams. "1999" was also released on the FOW Exclusive CD, available only to members of the Friends of The Whitlams, the band's official fanclub.

Track listing 
All tracks written by Tim Freedman, unless otherwise noted.

 "No Aphrodisiac" (Freedman, G. Dormand, M. Ford) – 4:19
 "Buy Now Pay Later (Charlie No.2)" – 3:46
 "Love Is Everywhere" – 4:01
 "You Sound Like Louis Burdett" (Freedman, M. Wells) – 4:01
 "Melbourne" – 4:50
 "Where's the Enemy?" (Tim Hall) – 4:09
 "Charlie No.3" (Freedman, G. Gertler) – 4:23
 "Life's a Beach" – 3:39
 "Tangled Up in Blue" (Bob Dylan) – 5:39
 "Laugh in Their Faces" – 4:13
 "Charlie No.1" – 3:10
 "Up Against the Wall" – 5:28
 "Band on Every Corner" – 2:53

Personnel 

 Tim Freedman – piano, vocals, backing vocals
 Tim Hall – guitar, vocals, backing vocals, trebley wah guitar
 Andy Lewis – bass, double bass
 Oscar Briz
 Bernie Hayes
 Matt Galvin
 Nick Freedman
 Ian Hildebrand
 Chris Abrahams
 Larry Muhoberac
 Cottco Lovett
 Michael Vidale
 Mike Richards
 Stuart Eadie
 Scott Johnson
 Steph Miller
 Greta Gertler
 Robert Hindley
 Fourplay
 Paul Jensen
 Andy Kell
 Daniel Barnett
 Bill Heckenberg

Awards and nominations

Awards 

 1997 Triple J Hottest 100 Winner, for No Aphrodisiac
 1998 ARIA Awards, Song of the Year for "No Aphrodisiac"
 1998 ARIA Awards, Best Independent Release
 1998 ARIA Awards, Best Group
 This award was personally presented to the band by the man they named themselves after, Gough Whitlam.

Nominations 

 1998 ARIA Awards, Album of the Year
 1998 ARIA Awards, Single of the Year for "No Aphrodisiac"
 1998 ARIA Awards, Best Pop Release
 1998 ARIA Awards, Producer of the Year
 1998 ARIA Awards, Engineer of the Year

Charts

Weekly charts

Year-end charts

Certifications

References 

The Whitlams albums
1997 albums
ARIA Award-winning albums